Ben Franklin Transit is the operator of public transportation in Franklin and Benton counties in the U.S. state of Washington. Seventeen routes provide local service for the three component urban areas of the Tri-Cities: Richland, Kennewick, and Pasco. Five routes connect the Tri-Cities metro area, as well as extend to the municipalities of Benton City, Prosser, and West Richland. Most routes run six days a week. Bus service runs between 6AM and 10:00PM, Monday-Friday and 7AM and 10:00PM on Saturdays and select holidays. Trans+Plus covers the Tri-Cities portion of the service area 8:30PM to 12:00AM Monday-Saturday and 7:30AM to 6:00pm on Sundays. There is also an ADA Paratransit service Dial-a-Ride for those who are physically unable to use the regular transit bus service.

History 

The roots of public transportation in the Tri-Cities region can be traced back to the beginnings of the Hanford Site, which was opened in 1943 in the midst of World War II, and ultimately produced the plutonium used in the Fat Man bomb that was detonated over Nagasaki, Japan. General Electric, and later the Atomic Energy Commission, provided bus service as a way to bring its workers to and from the Hanford site to locales in the area, largely Richland.

In 1978, the voters of Benton County were asked to vote on a proposed county-wide bus system, but this measure was defeated, largely in part by the efforts of the Rockwell Hanford drivers, who feared that they would lose their jobs if the voters passed the proposal. (The Public Transportation Benefit Area (PTBA) officials later passed a resolution that the bus system would not compete with Rockwell Hanford). Two years later, a bus system proposal was brought to the voters again. However, this time officials largely scaled back the proposed service area to just Kennewick and Richland, and also included Pasco, located on the other side of the Columbia River in Franklin County. For a second time, the proposal was defeated. The next year saw better luck though, as the Benton-Franklin Public Transportation Benefit Area was officially formed on May 11, 1981, when voters in the service area voted to enact a sales tax levy of three-tenths of a cent to "finance a municipal corporation which would provide public transportation services in Benton and Franklin Counties."

May 10, 1982, saw the first day of passenger service for Ben Franklin Transit, ending with 2,043 total riders. Ridership continued to slowly grow after that, as more routes were launched and more buses were put into service. Ben Franklin Transit would later buy out the franchise of Bassett Transit who had been running commuter bus service to the unsecured portions of the Hanford site, primarily the Energy Northwest Nuclear Power Plant.  In 1998, Prosser Rural Transit was absorbed into Ben Franklin Transit.

Annexations 
 1996 Benton City
 1998 Prosser
 2005 Finley

Accolades 

In 2007, Ben Franklin Transit was awarded the Governor's Award for Sustainable Practices.

The new Administration building has received LEED Gold Certification

Fleet 

Originally operating with a fleet that largely consisted of used GM New Look buses bought from the Minneapolis, MN MTC (Metropolitan Transit Commission), Ben Franklin Transit put out a bid in 1987 for 30 new buses. After some delays, mainly due to cost and budgeting at the time, the $4.5 million bid was awarded to the Gillig Corporation, who would build a total of thirty-three Gillig Phantom coaches (6 30 ft and 27 35 ft) at a cost of $135,759 each.  In 1992, Gillig also won the contract to provide Ben Franklin Transit with eight 40-foot coaches which had been specified in the original order, but delayed due to cost.  All subsequent bids afterwards for town coaches have been awarded to Gillig, with the exception of the nine Optima Opus coaches purchased in 2003–2004.

O2Diesel 
In 2006 Ben Franklin Transit entered into an agreement with O2Diesel to test a blended fuel that included both bio-diesel and ethanol.  This experiment lasted for approximately 1 year but was ended due to cost and supply problems.

ZEPS EBus 
An electric bus from Complete Coach Works, converted from a 2005 Gillig Low Floor, was introduced into service in mid 2013. It primarily operated during weekday peak hours on the 23/26 pair. In a press release CCW announced a new battery pack that is being retrofitted into this bus.

Routes 
There are 22 routes which serve a specific local area as well as routes which provide a connection between the cities.

The KML file gives a rough approximation of the service area.  The PTBA boundary is contiguous with the populated areas, as well as many voting precincts that fill in the gaps.

Fares 
Fares are either by exact cash or pre-purchased ticket or pass. Upon payment of fare, a transfer valid for 90 minutes after arrival at the next transit center can be requested.  A day pass is also available from the driver.

References

Additional reading

External links 
 
  via Last Mile + Night/Sunday
  Tri-Cities ADA Paratransit
  Rural CONNECT & ADA Paratransit
 

Tri-Cities, Washington
Bus transportation in Washington (state)
Transportation in Benton County, Washington
Transportation in Franklin County, Washington
1981 establishments in Washington (state)
Transit agencies in Washington (state)